Francelia McWilliams Butler (April 25, 1913 – September 18, 1998) was an American scholar, pioneer and writer of children's literature. She is also known for creating the International Peace Games.

Biography 
Butler was born in Cleveland, Ohio.  She received a BA from Oberlin College, an MA from Georgetown University, and a Ph.D. from the University of Virginia.

Francelia married Jerome Butler who worked as a journalist for the Paris Herald Tribune (which became the International Herald Tribune). Her husband died in 1949.

First a journalist, then a professor, Francelia Butler taught at the University of Connecticut from the 1960s to the early 1990s. Officially titled "Children's Literature 200," the class was affectionately nicknamed “Kiddie Lit” by students. Its curriculum included guest lecturers such as Dr. Benjamin Spock and Madeleine L'Engle. Butler retired from UCONN in 1992.

Francelia Butler created the International Peace Games, then Peace First and now Peace by PEACE.  She founded the scholarly journal Children's Literature at Hollins University.  When much of the university's collection was ruined in a flood, Butler donated her own extensive collection of children's literature. The Graduate Program of Children's Literature at Hollins University founded an annual conference in her memory.

The university student-run program she developed as "Peace Games" at the University of Connecticut in 1989 lives on today as Peace by PEACE at the University of Connecticut and the University of Toronto, York University, and McGill University in Canada.

Books and articles 

 The Lucky Piece
 "The Relationship Between Moral Competence and Old Age in Richard II, 2 Henry IV, and Henry V"
 "Sharing Literature With Children: A Thematic Approach to Children's Literature"
 "Skipping Around the World: The Ritual Nature of Folk Rhymes"
 The Melted Refrigerator: Comedy and Combat in the Life of a Woman (2013)
 "With many battles won, a retired professor of children's literature fights fiercely for peace." New York Times Education Wednesday, May 11, 1994 Michael Winerip

References

External links 
 PeaceFirst
 International Peace Games
 
 The Francelia Butler Conference

1913 births
1998 deaths
Writers from Cleveland
Academics from Ohio
Oberlin College alumni
Georgetown University alumni
University of Virginia alumni
University of Connecticut faculty
20th-century American women writers
20th-century American non-fiction writers
American women non-fiction writers
Scholars of childhood
American women academics